The Suntory Ladies Open is an annual golf tournament on the LPGA of Japan Tour. It is first played in 1990. The event is held in Hyogo, currently at the Rokko International Golf Club. The prize fund for 2021 was ¥150,000,000 with ¥27,000,000 going to the winner.

Winners
2022 Miyū Yamashita
2021 Serena Aoki
2020 Cancelled
2019 Ai Suzuki
2018 Misuzu Narita
2017 Kim Ha-neul
2016 Kang Soo-yun
2015 Misuzu Narita
2014 Ahn Sun-ju
2013 Rikako Morita
2012 Kim Hyo-joo (amateur)
2011 Ahn Sun-ju
2010 Akane Iijima
2009 Shinobu Moromizato
2008 Momoko Ueda
2007 Zhang Na
2006 Nikki Campbell
2005 Yuri Fudoh
2004 Ai Miyazato
2003 Lee Ji-hee
2002 Takayo Bandoh
2001 Michiko Hattori
2000 Aki Nakano
1999 Kaori Higo
1998 Marnie McGuire
1997 Ikuyo Shiotani
1996 Won Jae-sook
1995 No tournament Kobe earthquake
1994 Masaki Maeda
1993 Masaki Maeda
1992 Reiko Kashiwado
1991 Fumiko Muraguchi
1990 Yueh-chyn Huang

External links
Official site 

LPGA of Japan Tour events
Golf tournaments in Japan
Sport in Hyōgo Prefecture
Tourist attractions in Hyōgo Prefecture
Recurring sporting events established in 1990
1990 establishments in Japan